is a railway station on the Kōnan Railway Kōnan Line in Hirakawa, Aomori, Japan, operated by the private railway operator Kōnan Railway Company.

Lines

Station layout
Tsugaru-Onoe Station has a one island platform. The station building is connected to the platform by a level crossing and is staffed.

Platforms

Adjacent stations

History
Tsugaru-Onoe Station was opened on September 1, 1927. Freight operations were discontinued in 1979. A new station building was completed in September 1979.
 The station has been operated as a kan'i itaku station since October 1980.

Surrounding area
Hirakawa city office Onoe branch
Onoe Post Office
Aomori Bank Onoe branch

See also
 List of railway stations in Japan

External links

 
Location map 

Railway stations in Aomori Prefecture
Konan Railway
Hirakawa, Aomori
Railway stations in Japan opened in 1927